BNS Abu Bakr (sometimes spelt Abu Bakar) is a Type 053H2 guided-missile frigate of Bangladesh Navy. The warship is serving in Bangladesh Navy since 2014. It is named after the first Rashidun Caliph Abu Bakr.

Armament
The ship is armed with two quad-pack C-802A anti-ship missile launchers. It also carries two Type 79A dual-100 mm gun to engage surface targets. For air defence role, the ship carries four Type 76 dual-37 mm AA guns. For anti-submarine operations, the ship has two five tube RBU-1200 anti-submarine rocket launchers. she also carries two depth charge (DC) racks and four DC projectors. There are two Mark 36 SRBOC 6-barrel decoy rocket launchers in the ship too.

Service history
Type 053H2 frigate BNS Abu Bakr was previously known as Huangshi, which served with People's Liberation Army Navy (PLAN) in the East Sea Fleet. She was commissioned in PLAN in 1986. In 2013 the ship was sold to the Bangladesh Navy.

BNS Abu Bakr was commissioned into the Bangladesh Navy on 1 March 2014. She is currently based at Chattogram under Commodore Commanding BN Flotilla.

From 21 to 25 April 2014, Abu Bakr took part in the 14th Western Pacific Naval Symposium and International Fleet Review-2014 at Qingdao, Shandong Province, China. During the tour, the ship visited the ports of Klang, Malaysia, Hong Kong, Sanya, China and Phuket, Thailand in a goodwill mission.

On 12 March 2015, the ship left for Malaysia to take part in Langkawi International Maritime and Aerospace Exhibition (LIMA)-2015. On her return journey, she visited the port of Yangon, Myanmar on a goodwill mission. She arrived at Chattogram on 31 March 2015.

The ship took part in Cooperation Afloat Readiness and Training(CARAT), an annual bilateral exercise with United States Navy, in 2015.

Abu Bakr visited the port of Colombo, Sri Lanka from 21 to 23 October 2015 on a goodwill visit.

In 2017, the ship gone through an upgradation process where its old Chinese Type 354 surface search radar and Type 517H-1 air search radar was replaced with new generation Selex ES made Kronos NAVAL 3D multifunction C-band AESA radar. This new radar has a range of 250 km.

BNS Abu Bakr participated in Exercise Bongosagar-2020, a bilateral exercise with Indian Navy, held on 4 to 5 October 2020 in the northern Bay of Bengal region. She also took part in the IN-BN Coordinated Patrol (CORPAT)-2020 exercise along the Bangladesh-India maritime border after the Bongosagar exercise ends.

See also
 List of active ships of the Bangladesh Navy

References

Ships of the Bangladesh Navy
Frigates of the Bangladesh Navy
Type 053H2 frigates of the Bangladesh Navy
Ships built in China
1985 ships